Lesley Gore Sings of Mixed-Up Hearts, also known as Sings of Mixed-Up Hearts, is the second studio album by Lesley Gore. It was released in 1963 as the follow-up to her debut album I'll Cry If I Want To.

Allmusic critic Richie Unterberger considers Lesley Gore Sings of Mixed-Up Hearts to be better than I'll Cry If I Want To and an "above average" though not excellent 1963 pop/rock album. Unterberger cites as a reason for being preferable to I'll Cry If I Want To that Lesley Gore Sings of Mixed-Up Hearts avoids the self-pity theme of the debut album. Unterberger also praises the album's three big hits, "She's a Fool", "You Don't Own Me" and "Sunshine, Lollipops, and Rainbows". "She's a Fool" and "You Don't Own Me" both reached the Top 5 on the Billboard Hot 100 in 1963. "Sunshine, Lollipops, and Rainbows", released as a single two years later, reached #13. Unterberger also praised the songs "If That's the Way You Want It" and "Run, Bobby, Run" for being "good moody girl group ditties" which benefited from Quincy Jones's production, but he rated the pop ballads "Fools Rush In" and "Young and Foolish" as being "pedestrian".

Track listing

Charts
Album
	

Singles

References

1963 albums
Lesley Gore albums
Mercury Records albums
Albums produced by Quincy Jones